2-Hexanone (methyl butyl ketone, MBK) is a ketone used as a general solvent and in paints. It dissolves cellulose nitrate, vinyl polymers and copolymers, and natural and synthetic resins. It is recommended as a solvent because it is photochemically inactive; however it has a very low safe threshold limit value. 2-Hexanone is absorbed through the lungs, orally and dermally and its metabolite, 2,5-hexanedione, is neurotoxic. Animal tests have shown that the neurotoxic effect of 2-hexanone may be potentiated by simultaneous administration of 2-butanone (methyl ethyl ketone, MEK).

References 

Hexanones
Ketone solvents